Jabulile Cynthia Nightingale Mkhwanazi (born 27 February 1975) is a South African African National Congress politician serving as a Member of the National Assembly of South Africa  from KwaZulu-Natal since 2019.

Political career
Mkhwanazi served as an African National Congress proportional representation councillor (PR) in the Newcastle Local Municipality.

Politics
For the general election on May 8, 2019, Mkhwanazi was the twelfth candidate on the  ANC's list of National Assembly candidates from KwaZulu-Natal. The ANC won 24 regional seats in KwaZulu-Natal and Mkhwanazi was elected to the National Assembly. She was sworn into office on May 22, during the first sitting of the National Assembly following the election. Mkhwanazi became a member of the Portfolio Committee on Public Enterprises on 27 June 2019.

In 2019, she had an 88% committee attendance rate as a Member of Parliament (14 meetings out of 16) and in 2020, she had a 92% committee attendance rate (24 meetings out of 26).

References

External links
Profile at Parliament of South Africa

Living people
1975 births
Zulu people
People from KwaZulu-Natal
African National Congress politicians
Members of the National Assembly of South Africa
Women members of the National Assembly of South Africa
21st-century South African politicians
21st-century South African women politicians